Tawfik Khatib (born 21 April 1954) is a former Israeli Arab politician who served as a member of the Knesset for the United Arab List and the Arab National Party between 1996 and 2003.

Biography
Born in Jaljulia, Khatib studied political science at Bar-Ilan University, gaining a BA. He went on to study Islamic culture, writing his MA thesis on ancient taxation.

In 1989 he became head of Jaljulia's local council. A member of the Islamic Movement, He was elected to the Knesset on the United Arab List list in the 1996 elections. After winning fifth place on the party's list for the 1999 elections he retained his seat, but on 19 February 2001, left the party to establish the Arab National Party along with Muhamad Kanan. Prior to the 2003 elections media reports suggested that Khatib would join Meretz, but nothing came of them, and he lost his seat.

Khatib is married with five children. He current teaches Arabic at Beit Berl College.

References

External links

1954 births
Living people
People from Jaljulia
United Arab List politicians
Arab National Party politicians
Arab members of the Knesset
Israeli educators
Bar-Ilan University alumni
Members of the 14th Knesset (1996–1999)
Members of the 15th Knesset (1999–2003)
Academic staff of Beit Berl College